University-Mount Wellington is an association football club in Auckland, New Zealand. It was formed from the amalgamation of University AFC and Mount Wellington AFC. The team play at Bill McKinlay Park, Panmure, Auckland.

Club history
During much of the 1970s and 1980s, Mt Wellington AFC was a strong club side, rivalled only by Christchurch United. The team won the Chatham Cup on five occasions, in 1973, 1980, 1982, 1983, and 1990. Since amalgamation, the cup has been won a further two times, in 2001 and 2003, making the club the only seven-time winner of the country's main knockout tournament. They also won the country's national league in 1972, 1974, 1980, 1982, and 1986.

Present day
In recent years, the club's senior contingent has been run primarily by Bohemian Celtic FC, formerly of the Auckland Sunday Football Association and 5-time-champions it the ASFA Premier League. Since Unimount & Bohemian Celtic FC aligned, the club has risen from AFF/NFF Conference football back into the NRFL 2nd Division. 

Bill McKinlay Park is the clubs home ground and the club has an artificial pitch which can schedule up to five matches in one day.

Players
Many of the country's top players have played for either University-Mount Wellington or its predecessor teams, including several members of New Zealand's first World Cup qualifiers, the 1982 All Whites. These players include Ricki Herbert, Brian Turner, Tony Sibley, Dave Taylor, Darren McClennan, Peter Henry, Jeff Campbell, Rodger Gray, John Houghton, Leigh Kenyon, Michael Ridenton and Fred de Jong.

Performance in OFC competitions

References

External links
Auckland Football Federation UMWAFC page
Official Website

Association football clubs in Auckland